The Castaibert III was the 3rd, but 2nd successful attempt at flying by Pablo Castaibert. This occurred in 1912, and was described in Boletin del Ae C. Argentino.

Specifications

Military operators

 Argentinian Air Force

Footnotes

References
 

1910s Argentine aircraft